Palaina capillacea, also known as the strong-bladed staircase snail, is a species of staircase snail that is endemic to Australia's Lord Howe Island in the Tasman Sea.

Description
The pupiform shell of adult snails is 3.8–4.1 mm in height, with a diameter of 1.9–2.1 mm and a conical spire. It is white in colour, with impressed sutures. It has bold, closely spaced, axal ribs. The umbilicus is closed. The circular aperture has a flared lip and an operculum is present. The animal has a white body with dark grey cephalic tentacles and black eyes.

Habitat
The snail is common and widespread throughout the island.

References

 
capillacea
Gastropods of Lord Howe Island
Taxa named by Ludwig Karl Georg Pfeiffer
Gastropods described in 1855